This is a list of Serbian paramilitary units and formations throughout history. It includes Serbian volunteer militias loyal to the Habsburg Monarchy prior to Serbian independence, and organizations loyal to Serbia since. Note that many of the organizations either started out or ended up folded into official military organizations. These are distinct from institutions with formal status and a direct leadership structure under a nation-state, examples being the World War I era First Serbian Division and the post-2006 modern Serbian Army, which do not belong on this list.

Organizations created before World War I 
Serbian Militia, Habsburg militia, active in the Great Turkish War (1683–1699)
Serbian Militia, Habsburg militia, active in the Kingdom of Serbia (1718–39)
Serbian Free Corps, Habsburg militia, active in the Austro-Turkish War (1787–1791)
Serbian Revolutionary Army, active in the Serbian Uprisings (1804–1817)
Komiti, anti-Ottoman rebels, active in the late 19th century
Serbian Chetnik Organization, anti-Ottoman rebels, active in Old Serbia and Macedonia (1903–08)

Balkan Wars and World War I 
Serbian Chetnik Organization, put under the command of the Royal Serbian Army in the Balkan Wars and World War I.
Association against Bulgarian Bandits, counter-terrorist unit in Macedonia in the Interwar period
Black Hand, secret society responsible for the assassination of Austrian Crownprince, the Archduke Franz Ferdinand. 
Narodna Odbrana, militant group closely tied to the Black Hand that committed war crimes in Macedonia during the Balkan Wars
Young Bosnia, militant group closely tied to the Black Hand that directly carried out the assassination
White Hand, a secret military organization in the Kingdom of Serbs, Croats, and Slovenes (later the Kingdom of Yugoslavia). It was established in order to counter the influence of the Black Hand, and relied on the People's Radical Party.

World War II 
Chetnik Detachments of the Yugoslav Army (Chetniks)
Lim-Sandžak Chetnik Detachment
Dinara Division
Pećanac Chetniks
Serbian Volunteer Corps

Yugoslav Wars 

Kninjas (Knindže), Serbian volunteer organization commanded by Dragan Vasiljković, active in Croatia.
Serb Volunteer Guard (Srpska dobrovoljačka garda), also known as "Arkan's Tigers", Serbian volunteer organization, active in Croatia and Bosnia.
Serbian Guard (Srpska garda), Serbian volunteer organization, armed wing of the Serbian Renewal Movement, active in Croatia in 1991.
White Eagles (Beli orlovi), also known as "Šešeljevci", Serbian volunteer organization, armed wing of the Serbian Radical Party, active in Bosnia and Croatia.
Wolves of Vučjak (Vukovi s Vučjaka), Bosnian Serb organization, active in Bosnia and Croatia between 1991 and 1993.
Yellow Wasps (Žute ose), Bosnian Serb organization, active in Bosnian Podrinje between April and October 1992.
Scorpions (Škorpioni), Serb organization, active in Croatia, Bosnia and Kosovo.
 (Srpski sokolovi), led by 
Greek Volunteer Guard, Greek volunteer organization under the Army of Republika Srpska, active in Bosnia and Croatia.
Jackals (Šakali), active in Kosovo in 1999.

Current 
Serbian Honour

See also 

 Chetniks, a disorganized set of militant groups associated with both World Wars and later conflicts
 Far-right politics in Serbia
 History of modern Serbia
 Serbian hajduks
 Serbian Volunteers (disambiguation)
 Yugoslav Partisans, anti-Nazi forces including Serbs among other ethnicities

References

External links 
 

Paramilitary formations